The 11th Infantry Regiment, King's Close Bodyguard (ร.11 ทม.รอ.) is a King's Guard regiment under the 1st Division, King's Guard of the Royal Thai Army. The regiment is divided into three battalions, all of them based in Bangkok. Formerly having a duty to guard the palace in the reign of King Mongkut to practice military subjects in order to perform effective and set up a Royal Palace Guard Regiment or the army surrounded the palace with the blue uniform is likely to come from the color of Krom Wang (Bureau of the Lord Chamberlain) uniforms. The reign of King Chulalongkorn please King Vajiravudh, when he was the Siamese Crown Prince as a special colonel of the regiment which makes the unit have a bond with King Vajiravudh. Later, when King Vajiravudh ascended the throne he was accepted as a special commander of the Regiment which His Majesty's color is blue.

History
The Royal Guards were established by King Mongkut (Rama IV) of Siam to serving and protect the monarchy by acting as a custody unit and supervise the safety situation neatness in the fence around the royal court, which led to commoners referring to them as the "Tahan Lorm Wang" (The palace bodyguards).

In the past political history of The 11th Infantry Regiment is considered an important role. Especially when any event occurs which led to the undermining of national security, then the 11th Infantry Regiment would take him to join one of the main forces of security as in the past such as Boworadet rebellion, Franco-Thai War , Manhattan Rebellion including Communist insurgency in Thailand. During 2010 Thai political protests 11th Infantry Regiment become a main role for Centre for Resolution of Emergency Situation to control protests of United Front for Democracy Against Dictatorship.

11th Infantry Regiment under the command of Colonel Thanom Kittikachorn was established as a King's Guard unit in His Majesty King Bhumibol Adulyadej on 20 January 1949. The Royal Guards still exist down to the present and serve as protectors of the Royal Family of Thailand. On 18 January 2019, the unit has renamed to 11th King's Own Bodyguard Regiment. Then, on 23 April 2019, the unit has renamed again to 11th Infantry Regiment, King's Close Bodyguard. On October 1, 2019, the unit was transferred to be directly to Royal Security Command  under the command of King Maha Vajiralongkorn, along with 1st Infantry Regiment.

Organization

Active
 1st Infantry Battalion, 11th King's Own Bodyguard Regiment (King Vajiralongkorn's Own Guards)
 2nd Infantry Battalion, 11th King's Own Bodyguard Regiment (King  Vajiralongkorn's Own Guards)
 3rd Infantry Battalion, 11th King's Own Bodyguard Regiment (King Vajiralongkorn's Own Guards)

Uniforms
The 1st and 2nd battalions wears a ceremonial uniform of scarlet blue and black facings and a bearskin-styled cap based on the British Army Foot Guards with a row of single buttons (similar to those used by the British Grenadier Guards).

Notable members
Crown Prince Maha Vajiravudh (later King Rama VI) Special Colonel of the regiment
Field Marshal Thanom Kittikachorn, Commander of the regiment, Prime Minister of Thailand (1963-1973,1958), Former Commander-in-Chief of the Royal Thai Army, Former Supreme Commander of the Royal Thai Armed Forces
General Apirat Kongsompong, Commander of the regiment, Former Commander-in-Chief of the Royal Thai Army (2018-2020)
General Pornpipat Benyasri, Former  Chief of Defence Forces (2018-2020)

Gallery

See also

List of army units called Guards
King's Guard (Thailand)
Thai Royal Guards parade
Monarchy of Thailand
Head of the Royal Thai Armed Forces
11th Infantry Regiment BTS station

References

King's Guard units of Thailand
Military units and formations established in 1902
Thailand Royal Guards
1902 establishments in Siam
Guards regiments